Georgi Gaydarov (born 10 December 1984) is a Bulgarian footballer who plays as a defender. He played in the Bulgarian A PFG.

References

External links

Bulgarian footballers
1984 births
Living people
PFC Vidima-Rakovski Sevlievo players
FC Etar 1924 Veliko Tarnovo players
First Professional Football League (Bulgaria) players

Association football defenders